Sarvestan Rural District is a rural district (dehestan) in the Central District of Sarvestan County, Fars Province, Iran. At the 2006 census, its population was 2,571, in 582 families.  The rural district has 14 villages.

References 

Rural Districts of Fars Province
Sarvestan County